The 2020 All Thailand Golf Tour was the 22nd season of the All Thailand Golf Tour, the main professional golf tour in Thailand since it was established in 1999. It was the second season in which world rankings points were given.

Schedule
The following table lists official events during the 2020 season.

Order of Merit
The Order of Merit was based on prize money won during the season, calculated in Thai baht.

Notes

References 

All Thailand Golf Tour
All Thailand Golf Tour